Françoise Dupuy (née Michaud; 6 February 1925 – 15 September 2022) was a French dancer and choreographer. She was married to fellow dancer and choreographer Dominique Dupuy.

Dupuy died on 15 September 2022, at the age of 97.

Written works
Une danse à l’œuvre (2001)
On ne danse jamais seul. Écrits sur la danse (2012)
Album (2017)
L'éveil et l'initiation à la danse (2017)
Deux à danser

References

1925 births
2022 deaths
French dancers
French choreographers
French women writers
People from Lyon